Qubbat Afandina (meaning: "the Dome of Our Sir"), the Mausoleum of Khedive Tawfiq, is a 19th-century monument located in the Afifi area on the eastern edge of the Northern Cemetery of Mamluk Necropoli of Cairo, Egypt.

Description
The mausoleum was built in 1894 by the Khedive Abbas II of Egypt (1874 – 1944), in memory of his father Khedive Tawfiq Pasha who died in 1892. It was designed by the khedival royal court architect Dimitrius Fabricius Pasha (1847-1907), in a Neo-Mamluk architectural style.

Qubbat Afandina is the resting place of many members of the Royal family of Muhammad Ali Pasha, including: Khedive Tewfiq Pasha (1852-1892), Princess Bamba Qadin(?-1871), Princess Emina Ilhamy (1858–1931), and her son Khedive Abbas II.

See also
Muhammad Ali dynasty family tree
Mausolea

References

Notes

Bibliography 
 Mohamed Elshahed, Cairo Since 1900: An Architectural Guide, American University in Cairo Press, 2019, 9789774168697, 240 pages.
 Williams, Caroline, Islamic Monuments in Cairo: The Practical Guide, Cairo: American University of Cairo Press, 2008, 214 pages.
 Byrne, Aran, East-West Divan: In Memory of Werner Mark Linz, Gingko Library, London, UK, 2014.
 Richard Bordeaux Parker, Islamic Monuments in Cairo: A Practical Guide, American University in Cairo Press. 1993, 312 pages.

External links 
Qubbat Afandina: Egypt's Royal Cemetery
Images from Qubbat Afandina
Rulers of Egypt from the House of Mohammed Aly

Buildings and structures completed in 1894
Buildings and structures in Cairo
Domes
Islamic architecture
19th-century architecture in Egypt